Acholeplasmataceae is a family of bacteria. It is the only family in the order  Acholeplasmatales, placed in the class Mollicutes. The family comprises the genera Acholeplasma and Phytoplasma. Phytoplasma has the candidatus status, because members still could not be cultured.

Etymology: The names Acholeplasmataceae and Acholetoplasmatales are derived from the Greek a = not, cholè = bile and  plasma = anything moulded or formed. Species in the order Acholeplasmatales can grow in a medium without cholesterol, unlike species in the order Mycoplasmatales. Cholesterol, a sterol, is an important component of the cell membrane of mycoplasmas, whereas in acholeplasmas and in bacteria in general it is absent.

Characteristics 
Members of Acholeplasmatales are facultative anaerobic. They are parasites or commensals of vertebrates, insects, or plants; some are saprophytes.

Phytoplasmas colonize the phloem sieve elements of vascular plants, causing diseases. They are transmitted by sap-sucking insects (primarily leafhoppers, planthoppers, and psyllids

), living in the gut, haemolymph, salivary gland and other organs. Like other mollicutes, they show a high host specificity.

Classification
In the first taxonomy of Mollicutes, the classification was based on requiring or not requiring cholesterol for growth. The old order Mycoplasmatales consisted of two families: Mycoplasmataceae, which requires cholesterol, and the sterol-nonrequiring Acholeplasmataceae.

In view of the many properties in which the acholeplasmas distinguish from species in Mycoplasmataceae and Spiroplasmataceae, Freundt et al. proposed in 1984 to elevate the family Acholeplasmataceae to the ordinal rank Acholeplasmatales, thus separating it from Mycoplasmatales.

In 1987, the division in sterol requiring and not requiring changed with the addition of a third order, Anaeroplasmatales, taking into account that dependence on anaerobic growth conditions is an important characteristic.

The currently accepted taxonomy is based on the List of Prokaryotic names with Standing in Nomenclature (LPSN) and National Center for Biotechnology Information (NCBI)

See also
 List of bacteria genera
 List of bacterial orders

References 

Mollicutes